Callopistria granitosa, the granitose fern moth, is a species of moth in the family Noctuidae (the owlet moths).

The MONA or Hodges number for Callopistria granitosa is 9632.

References

Further reading

 
 
 

Noctuidae
Articles created by Qbugbot
Moths described in 1852